Bonginkosi Ntuli (born 28 March 1991), commonly known as Bongi Ntuli, is a South African professional soccer player who plays for AmaZulu F.C. as a striker.

Club career
Ntuli began his career in the Vodacom League with Sobantu Shooting Stars before joining the Golden Arrows reserve team. He made his debut for Arrows in January 2012. He went on to join Mamelodi Sundowns in 2014, however, he battled to break into the team and a six months he later joined AmaZulu on loan. From 2015 to 2018, Ntuli was on loan at Platinum Stars.

In July 2018, Ntuli went on trial with Djurgårdens IF. His move to Europe did not materialize, this due to Ntuli and Djurgardens not being able to agree on the financials of his deal. In August 2018 it was confirmed that Ntuli had joined AmaZulu on loan, with his deal becoming permanent after being part of a swap deal which saw him stay onboard with AmaZulu and Emiliano Tade go the other way and join Sundowns.

References

External links
 
 

1991 births
Living people
South African soccer players
Association football forwards
Mamelodi Sundowns F.C. players
AmaZulu F.C. players
Platinum Stars F.C. players
Lamontville Golden Arrows F.C. players
Sportspeople from Pietermaritzburg
Soccer players from KwaZulu-Natal